Plishkino is a rural locality (a village) in Dubrovskoye Rural Settlement, Yelovsky District, Perm Krai, Russia. The population was 118 as of 2010. There are 4 streets.

Geography 
Plishkino is located 39 km southwest of Yelovo (the district's administrative centre) by road. Pankovo is the nearest rural locality.

References 

Rural localities in Yelovsky District